Tennis at the 2003 Pacific Games in Suva was held on June 30 – July 6, 2003.

Medal summary

Medal table

Medals events

See also
 Tennis at the Pacific Games

References

2003 South Pacific Games
Pacific Games
2003